Hyponephele tenuistigma is a butterfly species belonging to the family Nymphalidae. It is found in Afghanistan, Pakistan, Kashmir and the western part of the Pamir Mountains.

References

Hyponephele
Fauna of Pakistan